The National Seal of the Republic of Korea is a governmental seal used for purposes of state in South Korea. The seal is carved with characters called injang.

Since the late 20th century the seal's design consists of South Korea's official name written in Korean characters inside of a square; during the mid-20th century Chinese characters were used.

History
Following the establishment of the South Korean state in August 1948, its government adopted in May 1949 a new state seal, or guksae. It is used in promulgation of constitutions, designation of cabinet members and ambassadors, conference of national orders and important diplomatic documents.

The seal's design has been modified multiple times over the years. The first version of the seal, used until the early 1960s, used Hanja characters. In the late 20th century, the lettering was changed to use only Korean characters.

The current seal is the fifth version and was designed in September 2011, being adopted in October 2011.

Previous seals

See also

Imperial Seal of China
Cash seal (China)
National Seals of the Republic of China
Seal of the State Council of the People's Republic of China
Privy Seal of Japan
State Seal of Japan
Seal script
Seal cutting (art)
Seal engraving (art)
Seal knob

References 

 

National seals
National symbols of South Korea